The 1997 Women's Hockey Junior World Cup was the 3rd edition of the Women's Hockey Junior World Cup. It was held from 2 to 13 September 1993 in Seongnam, South Korea.

Netherlands won the tournament for the first time after defeating Australia 2–0 in the final. Argentina won the third place match by defeating Germany 3–1 in the third and fourth place playoff.

Teams
Each continental federation received a number of quotas depending on the FIH World Rankings for teams qualified through their junior continental championships. Alongside the host nation, 16 teams competed in the tournament.

 (defending champions)

Results

First round

Pool A

Pool B

Second round

Ninth to twelfth place classification

Cross-overs

Eleventh and twelfth place

Ninth and tenth place

Fifth to eighth place classification

Cross-overs

Seventh and eighth place

Fifth and sixth place

First to fourth place classification

Semi-finals

Third and fourth place

Final

Awards

Statistics

Final standings

References

Women's Hockey Junior World Cup
Junior World Cup
International women's field hockey competitions hosted by South Korea
Hockey Junior World Cup
Seongnam
Sport in Gyeonggi Province
Hockey Junior World Cup
Hockey World Cup